The 1998–99 season of the Slovak Second Football League (also known as 2. liga) was the sixth season of the league since its establishment. It began on 1 August 1998 and ended on 13 June 1999.

League standing

See also
1998–99 Slovak Superliga

References
 Jindřich Horák, Lubomír Král: Encyklopedie našeho fotbalu, Libri 1997

2. Liga (Slovakia) seasons
2
Slovak